Acorea, microphthalmia and cataract syndrome is a rare genetically inherited condition.

Presentation

Acorea or fibrous occlusion of the pupil, microphthalmia and cataracts are present in both eyes. Microcornea and iridocorneal dysgenesis also occur. The retina and optic disc are normal.

Genetics

The cause of this condition is not presently known. It appears to be inherited in an autosomal dominant fashion.

Diagnosis

Treatment

References

Genetic disorders by system
Congenital disorders of eyes
Syndromes affecting the eye
Rare syndromes